Harold Allen (13 October 1886 – 9 July 1939) was an Australian cricketer. He was born in 1886 in Invercargill, New Zealand. He played two first-class matches for Tasmania between 1912 and 1914.

See also
 List of Tasmanian representative cricketers

References

External links
 

1886 births
1939 deaths
Australian cricketers
Tasmania cricketers
Cricketers from Tasmania
Cricketers from Invercargill
New Zealand emigrants to Australia